Sleepless in the Saddle  (SITS) was a series of 24-hour mountain bike races held in the UK, Australia and the USA. The format of the race allowed entries to either be from solo riders, or by teams of varying sizes who rode in relay. It was an endurance event based on cross-country tracks. The winner of the race was the person, or team, who covered the greatest distance in the 24 hours.

From 2005 to 2007 the event became part of the Kona Global Series. The races were held in the USA, UK, and Australia. The name was originally coined by Chipps Chippendale. Sleepless in the Saddle races have been held at Catton Park and Trentham Gardens.

History

The first race was held in the UK in 2001 at Trentham Gardens. The UK races moved to Catton Park in 2005. The race became part of a series in 2005 with additional rounds in the USA and Australia. The Kona Global Series lasted from 2005 to 2007. The race was last held in 2012.

The 2006 US Race was held at Snow Mountain Ranch, Granby, Colorado. The 2007 US race was cancelled. The 2006 Australian Race was held at Redesdale, Victoria.

Sponsors

From 2005, the UK race was sponsored by Kona, having previously been sponsored by Shimano. The race sponsor for 2008, 2009 and 2010 was Endura, a cycle clothing manufacturer based in Livingston, Scotland. For 2011 Singletrack magazine was the headline sponsor.

The Australian race sponsor from 2006 to 2009 was Kona. The 2010 Australian Race was sponsored by Jeep.

See also
Mountain bike racing
Mountain Mayhem
24 Hours of Adrenalin

External links
Sleepless in the Saddle (UK)
Jeep 24 hour (Australia)

Results

2009 and 2010 UK results are available by following the Sleepless in the Saddle link above. For Australian results:
Kona 24 - 2009
Kona 24 - 2008
Kona Global Series - 2007
Kona Global Series - 2006

References

Mountain biking events in the United Kingdom